Library tram stop is a tram stop on Line 1 of the West Midlands Metro located in Birmingham outside the Library of Birmingham. It opened on 11 December 2019 as the line's terminus when it was extended from Grand Central. In July 2022 the line was extended to Edgbaston.

References

External links

Centenary Square, Birmingham
Railway stations in Great Britain opened in 2019
West Midlands Metro stops